, with the subtitles  and Which Girl do you Trust?, is a reader-participation game in the Japanese bishōjo magazine Dengeki G's Magazine, published by ASCII Media Works, which ran between the February 2008 and May 2011 issues. The project had been first announced in the two-hundredth issue of Dengeki G's Magazine released in the October 2007 issue, and the project itself is a form of commemoration for the achievement. Ohime-sama Navigation'''s premise is written by Satz, and the character design is by Naru Nanao, known for her artistry on D.C.: Da Capo by Circus and Ef: A Fairy Tale of the Two. by Minori. A manga adaptation entitled Hime Navi was serialized between the June 2008 and June 2010 issues of Dengeki G's Magazine illustrated by Raina, and a second manga using the original title was serialized in the same magazine between the November 2008 and June 2010 issues illustrated by Yūki Takami.

Plot

StoryOhime-sama Navigation revolves around three young girls enrolled at a fortune-telling school named Kaisen Academy. Each is learning different forms of fortune-telling at the school, though they are in the same class and have the same homeroom teacher — Mai Komura.

Characters

Crystal is a girl dressed like a witch. She was born on February 10, and has O type blood, making her a "Little Red Riding Hood"-type princess.

Hime is a girl dressed like a miko. She was born on July 21, and has AB type blood, making her a "Princess Kaguya"-type princess.

Kari is a girl dressed in a Southeast Asia style. She was born on May 4 and has A type blood, making her a "Snow Queen"-type princess.

Mai is the homeroom teacher to Cystal, Hime, and Kari.

Princess types

Media

Reader-participation gameOhime-sama Navigation is a reader-participation game that ran from the February 2008 to May 2011 issues of ASCII Media Works' bishōjo magazine Dengeki G's Magazine. Originally, the readers were given three heroines—Crystal Hoshikawa, Hime Kaguyama, and Kari Nano—and the readers were able to vote on their birth dates and blood types which would determine their "princess type" which corresponds to princess in fairy tales. The main part of the game is for the readers to give advice to the three heroines as they attend the fortune-telling school.

Manga
A manga adaptation entitled  was serialized in ASCII Media Works' Dengeki G's Magazine between the June 2008 and June 2010 issues and is illustrated by Raina. The first volume of Hime Navi containing the first thirteen chapters was released on June 27, 2009 under ASCII Media Works' Dengeki Comics imprint. A second manga, entitled Ohime-sama Navigation, was serialized in the same magazine between the November 2008 and June 2010 issues and is illustrated by Yūki Takami. Three volumes of Ohime-sama Navigation'' were released between June 27, 2009 and August 27, 2010 under Dengeki Comics.

External links
Official website 

2008 Japanese novels
ASCII Media Works manga
Dengeki Comics
Dengeki G's Magazine
Kadokawa Dwango franchises
Harem anime and manga
2008 manga
Seinen manga
Light novels